The Philippine Senate Committee on Banks, Financial Institutions and Currencies is a standing committee of the Senate of the Philippines.

Jurisdiction 
According to the Rules of the Senate, the committee handles all matters relating to:

 Banks
 Financial institutions
 Government and private currencies
 Capital markets
 Mutual funds
 Securitization
 Coinage
 Circulation of money

Members, 18th Congress 
Based on the Rules of the Senate, the Senate Committee on Banks, Financial Institutions and Currencies has 9 members.

The President Pro Tempore, the Majority Floor Leader, and the Minority Floor Leader are ex officio members.

Here are the members of the committee in the 18th Congress as of September 24, 2020:

Committee secretary: Harold Ian V. Bartolome

See also 

 List of Philippine Senate committees

References 

Banks
Finance in the Philippines